The James Bay project is a proposed lithium pegmatite mine in Canada. The project is located in eastern Canada in Quebec. The James Bay mine has reserves amounting to 22.2 million tonnes of lithium ore grading 0.58% lithium thus resulting 0.13 million tonnes of lithium.

References 

Lithium mines in Canada